Anthony Darrin Horton (born December 6, 1944) is a retired American Major League Baseball player. A first baseman who batted and threw right-handed, Horton played for the Boston Red Sox (1964–67) and Cleveland Indians (1967–70).

Career

In 106 games played as an Indian, Horton batted .281 with 10 home runs and 44 runs batted in.

 was a curious season for Horton. He batted .269 with 17 home runs and 59 RBIs in a season full of ups and downs. On May 24 of that year in the second game of a doubleheader, he hit three home runs in an 8–7 loss to the New York Yankees but was reportedly upset about not hitting a fourth.  Exactly one month later, again against the Yankees and in the first game of another doubleheader, he fouled off a “folly floater” from Steve Hamilton. He asked for another "Folly Floater," Hamilton threw it and Horton again popped it foul behind home plate, but this time into Thurman Munson's mitt for an out. An embarrassed Horton crawled back into the dugout.

On July 2, Horton hit for the cycle in a 10–9 victory over the Baltimore Orioles. His playing career ended unexpectedly on August 28, after he took himself out in the fifth inning of the second game of a doubleheader against the California Angels. He was treated and recovered, but the stress of professional baseball forced him to leave the game prematurely; he had played his last game three months shy of his 26th birthday. His manager, Alvin Dark, in his book When in Doubt, Fire the Manager, would call Horton's sudden exit “the most sorrowful incident I was ever involved in, in my baseball career.”

In his very short career, Horton batted .268 with 76 home runs and 297 RBIs in 636 games played. His early exit from the game has often been tied to Indian lore with the Curse of Rocky Colavito.

See also
 List of Major League Baseball players to hit for the cycle

References

Further reading

External links
, or Retrosheet

1944 births
Boston Red Sox players
Cleveland Indians players
Baseball players from Santa Monica, California
Major League Baseball first basemen
Toronto Maple Leafs (International League) players
Parade High School All-Americans (boys' basketball)
Living people
Florida Instructional League Red Sox players
Reading Red Sox players
American expatriate baseball players in Canada
University High School (Los Angeles) alumni
Waterloo Hawks (baseball) players